Braim is an unincorporated community in Alberta, Canada within Camrose County that is recognized as a designated place by Statistics Canada. It is adjacent to the City of Camrose to the south and the Camrose Airport to the east.

Demographics 

See also 
List of communities in Alberta
List of designated places in Alberta

References 

Designated places in Alberta
Localities in Camrose County